WITC may refer to:

 WITC (FM), an FM radio station located in Cazenovia, New York
 WITC, ICAO code for Cut Nyak Dhien Airport in Meulaboh, Aceh
 A Weekend in the City, a Bloc Party album
 Wisconsin Indianhead Technical College